The Umatilla County Fair is a fair held in Hermiston in Umatilla County, Oregon. The fair runs from the middle of June through to the middle of August each year. It was started in August 1912 as the Hermiston Dairy and Hog Show as a joint fair with Morrow County, a one-time-only affair since legislation in 1913 made it no longer possible to have a bi-county fair.

This old-fashioned fair is held annually in Eastern Oregon and generally provides traveling carnival rides, livestock and open class exhibits, and live entertainers with bleacher capacity of about 500 people in conjunction with Farm City Pro Rodeo.

The fair had just a youth livestock auction in 2020, as others were cancelled on grounds of COVID-19 pandemic.

References

External links 
 Official Website
 Hail Storm at the Umatilla County Fair KEPR-TV news video.
 Video: Umatilla County Fair 2009 Sights and Sounds By Robert Deane — The Hermiston Herald

Annual fairs
Tourist attractions in Umatilla County, Oregon
Fairgrounds in the United States
Recurring events established in 1912
Festivals in Oregon
August events
Agriculture in Oregon
Rodeos
Fairs in Oregon
1912 establishments in Oregon
Annual events in Oregon
Hermiston, Oregon